Lady Mary Jane Maitland became Mary Jane Brabazon, Countess of Meath (15 March 1847 – 4 November 1918) was a British philanthropist; founder of the Ministering Children's League.

Life 
Maitland was born in 1847 in London. She was the daughter of Amelia (born Young) and 11th Earl of Lauderdale.

In 1868 she married Reginald Brabazon, 12th Earl of Meath.

Brabazon served as a diplomat abroad but he refused to go to Athens in 1873 to please her family. He resigned in 1877. He and his wife did not need to work so they decided to deal with "social problems and the relief of human suffering". The Earl and his wife leased Ottershaw Park from 1882 to November 1883 from Sir Edward Colebrooke.

In 1885 she set up the Ministering Children's League.

In 1890 she bought Westbrook Place in Godalming and over the next two years it was converted to be The Meath Home of Comfort for Epileptics. The home was for epileptic women and it was opened by the Duchess of Albany on 4 August 1892. It was based on the ideas of Friedrich von Bodelschwingh. In time two large extensions were added to the home.

She tried to set up a branch of the Ministering Children's League when she visited abroad. In 1892 she and her husband visited New Zealand and Tasmania. In Hobart she spoke about the success of the Ministering Children's League where it was said there was 40,000 members. It was agreed to start a group in Hobart and this work was led by Emily Dobson. By 1906 there was a home in Victoria.

In 1909 she went to Shanghai where again she inspired a new group of the MCL. There was already a group in Hong Kong, but by 1910 she inspired other groups in Penang and Singapore. She felt that she had created divisions in "the East" but she was keen that the MCL should not confine itself to aglophones bit it might also spread to children native to the countries involved.

Death and legacy

She died on 4 November 1918 in Ireland. She was survived by her husband. She left her property as a gift to her charities to further their work.

Her diaries were published in 1928.

References

1847 births
1918 deaths
People from London
Philanthropists
British countesses
Daughters of British earls